The Seton Canal is a diversion of the flow of the Seton River from Seton Dam, just below the flow of Seton Lake, to the Seton Powerhouse on the Fraser River at the town of Lillooet, British Columbia, Canada.  The canal bridges Cayoosh Creek 300m below its commencement and is about 3.5 km in length, ending just below a bridge used by the Texas Creek Road (aka the West Side Road), where the canal's waterflow is fed into tunnels which feed the Seton Powerhouse on the farther side of a small rocky hill.  Most of the water carried by the canal is the volume of the diverted Bridge River, which is fed into Seton Lake via BC Hydro's Bridge River generating stations at Shalalth, 16 km to the west, which are supplied by diversion tunnels through Mission Ridge from Carpenter Lake, the reservoir created by Terzaghi Dam.

References
BC Hydro information page

Lillooet Country
Canals in British Columbia
BC Hydro